The 1901–02 Syracuse Orangemen men's basketball team represented Syracuse University during the 1901–02 college men's basketball season. Instead of a head coach, the team's operations was headed by manager Fred Griffin.

Schedule

|-

Source

Roster
Arthur Brady
Clinton Goodwin
Earl Twombley
Clarence Houseknecht
Harley Crane
Frank Bohr
Fred Griffin
Courtney Whittemore

References

External links
 OrangeHoops.com recap of 1901–02 season

Syracuse
Syracuse Orange men's basketball seasons
Syracuse Orangemen Basketball Team
Syracuse Orangemen Basketball Team